The women's 400 metres hurdles event at the 2015 European Athletics U23 Championships was held in Tallinn, Estonia, at Kadriorg Stadium on 10, 11 and 12 July.

Medalists

Results

Final
12 July

Semifinals
11 July

Semifinal 1

Semifinal 2

Heats
10 July

Heat 1

Heat 2

Heat 3

Heat 4

Participation
According to an unofficial count, 28 athletes from 20 countries participated in the event.

References

400 metres hurdles
400 metres hurdles at the European Athletics U23 Championships